Lingering may refer to:

"Lingering", a 2014 song by Sheppard from the album Bombs Away
Lingering Pt. I, a 2017 album by Sleep Party People
Lingering Pt. II, a 2018 album by Sleep Party People
Lingering (film), a 2020 South Korean horror drama film starring Lee Se-young

See also

 Lingering Garden, Suzhou, Jiangsu, China; a renowned classical Chinese garden
 
 Linger (disambiguation)
 Ling (disambiguation)